The Armenian Evangelical Central High School is one of the oldest and most-well established Armenian schools in Lebanon. It was founded in 1922 in a refugee camp, on the initiative of the Reverend Yenovk Hadidian. Ten years later, it moved to its present location in Ashrafieh, eastern Beirut.

The current principal is Mrs. Maral Deyirmenjian (2007- ).

History
After the Armenian genocide, the Armenians, who had sought refuge on the Eastern shores of the Mediterranean, tried to revive the Armenian life in a foreign land. One of the first envoys of this holy mission was Rev. Yenovk Hadidian, who formed an elementary school, in order to create a small Armenian family who would receive an evangelical education, and would give rise to new Armenian generations. On May 16, 1922, the first branch of the school started operating in a hut named “Adana Camp” in Beirut.

In 1922, a second evangelical school was formed in the nearby “Isgenderon camp”. In 1924, the two schools united under the name “Armenian Evangelical School for boys and girls”. It received its official license in 1925. Through Reverend Henry H. Riggs' generous donation, and in memory of his wife and daughter, a new building was built to serve as a church and classroom in the Ashrafieh area.

During the years 1943-50, in successive steps the school underwent further changes:

 It became a full high school, with 11 years of study after 3 years of kindergarten.
 It developed its own library within the possibilities of the times.
 It furnished a modest laboratory with three departments - physics, chemistry and biology.
 It developed a good high school choir with four voices.
 It started the tradition of annual field days.
 It started publishing Arpi — the annual schoolbook.
 Organized parent-teacher meetings and teacher training seminars

The advancement of the Armenian Evangelical Central School continued as it set its first secondary class in the academic year 1944–1945. Ever since that day, the school is renamed Armenian Evangelical Central High School.

In 1965, the school starts implementing the official state educational program with its three levels of examination: Certificate (6th grade), Brevet (9th grade), First and Second Baccalaureates (11th and 12th grades).

In 1969, the kindergarten and elementary building was completed, and included a memorial hall dedicated to the victims of an accident during a school trip that took place on April 1, 1960, costing the life of 3 teachers and 18 students.

During the academic year 1976–1977, grade twelve was established.

The school celebrated its 60th anniversary in 1982 with commemorative events and its 65th in 1987 with a concert of performing arts. The publication of a large-format anniversary scrapbook/photo album marked the 70th anniversary. In 2002, church and community leaders, government ministers, academic representatives, school principals and others join the school family and its alumni in a public 80th anniversary grand jubilee.

Principals
 2007- : Maral Deyirmenjian
 1997-2007: Sonia Sislian
 1988-1997: Sona Nashian
 1981-1988: Artoon Hamalian
 1975-1981: Aram Boolghoorjian
 1969-1975: Hovhannes Havoonjian
 1965-1969: Hagop Loussararian
 1960-1965: Rev. Dikran Khntrooni
 1959-1960: Hagop Boujikanian
 1958-1959: Lucine Kurkjian & Manasseh Shnorhokian
 1956-1958: Bedros Hagopian
 1950-1956: Kegham Missisian
 1946-1950: Manasseh Shnorhokian
 1943-1946: Rev. Yetvart Tovmassian
 1942-1943: Araxie Poladian
 1938-1942: Hagop Boujikanian
 1936-1938: Araxie Poladian
 1935-1936: Rev. Haigazoun Ghazarian
 1931-1935: George Gaidzaguian
 1930-1931: Makrouhi Garabedian
 1929-1931: Haroutiun Hmayan
 1928-1929: Senem Saatjian
 1922-1928: Jemileh Kardashian

See also
 Armenian Evangelical School of Trad (Trad, Lebanon)
 Armenian Evangelical Peter and Elizabeth Torosian School (Amanos, Lebanon)
 Armenian Evangelical Shamlian Tatigian Secondary School (Bourj Hammoud, Lebanon)
 Armenian Evangelical Guertmenian School (Ashrafieh, Lebanon)
 Yeprem and Martha Philibosian Armenian Evangelical College (Beirut, Lebanon)
 Armenian Evangelical Secondary School of Anjar (Anjar, Lebanon)
 Haigazian University (Riad El Solh, Beirut, Lebanon)

External links
 http://www.aechs.com/
 https://web.archive.org/web/20050131213517/http://chs22.com/ (The combined website of the Armenian Evangelical Central High school in Beirut and its alumni group in the United States)
 Educational Council of the Union of the Armenian Evangelical Churches in the Near East (UAECNE)

Schools in Lebanon
Educational institutions established in 1922
Armenian Evangelical schools
1920s establishments in Lebanon